Yevhen Hrytsenko (born 5 February 1995) is a Ukrainian professional footballer who plays as a goalkeeper.

Career
Hrytsenko is a product of the Shakhtar Donetsk youth system, signing a professional contract with the team in 2012.

He played in the Ukrainian Second League for FC Shakhtar-3 Donetsk and then in the Ukrainian Premier League Reserves and never made his debut for Shakhtar Donetsk in the Ukrainian Premier League. In June 2017, it was announced that he would go on loan to FC Mariupol, but one week later he returned to FC Shakhtar reserves. On 28 June 2018 he finally completed a one-year loan move to FC Mariupol.

On 7 November 2022, Van announced the signing of Hrytsenko. On 9 February 2023, Hrytsenko left Van by mutual consent.

References

External links 
 
 

1995 births
Living people
Footballers from Donetsk
Ukrainian footballers
FC Shakhtar-3 Donetsk players
FC Mariupol players  
FC Van players
Association football goalkeepers
Ukrainian Second League players
Expatriate footballers in Armenia
Ukrainian expatriate sportspeople in Armenia